Arpad Jakob Valentin Wigand (13 January 1906 – 26 July 1983) was a Nazi German war criminal with the rank of SS-Oberführer who served as the SS and Police Leader in Warsaw (SS-und Polizeiführer (SSPF) from 4 August 1941 until 23 April 1943 during the occupation of Poland in World War II.

As an aide to Erich von dem Bach Zelewski he first suggested the site of the former Austrian and later Polish artillery barracks in the Zasole suburb of Oswiecim for a concentration camp in January 1940. This site would evolve into the Auschwitz concentration camp which went on to become a major site of the Nazi "Final Solution to the Jewish question" resulting in the death of up to 1,000,000 Jews.

Trial and conviction
After the war, he found himself in British captivity who later extradited him to Poland. In 1950, Wigand was sentenced by the District Court in Warsaw for crimes against humanity to 15 years imprisonment, but was released in 1956 and deported to West Germany. In 1961, he was arrested by the West German judiciary and charged with participating in the murder of at least 2,300 Jews in Warsaw. Wigand was convicted of ordering police to shoot Jews found outside of the Warsaw ghetto in which they were forced to live. The court said it could not ascertain the exact number of Jews killed because of his order, but at least 100 died between August 1941 and the spring of 1942 when Wigand was police chief. This time Wigand was sentenced to 12 years and 6 months in prison.

The court rejected the defenses contention that the order was designed to halt the spread of typhus by preventing carriers from leaving the ghetto. It called that defense 'monstrous.'

References

1906 births
1983 deaths
SS-Oberführer
SS and Police Leaders
Einsatzgruppen personnel
Waffen-SS personnel
Holocaust perpetrators in Poland
People convicted of crimes against humanity
German prisoners of war in World War II held by the United Kingdom